The mantids of Trinidad and Tobago are part of the invertebrate fauna of both islands, part of the Natural history of Trinidad and Tobago.

Beginning with Lawrence Bruner in 1906  describing 8 species on the island of Trinidad, then followed by Beebe, Crane & Hughes-Schrader in 1952 and Kevan in 1953. Both papers in the 1950s increased the number of species identified.

Mantids by family 

Mantoididae
 Mantoida fulgidipennis Westwood, 1889

Thespidae
 Thespinae
 Musonia surinama (Saussure, 1869)
 Thespis media (Giglio-Tos, 1916)
 Macromusonia sp. Hebard, 1922 
 Oligonicinae
 Thesprotia filum (Lichtenstein, 1796)
 Miopteryginae
 Bantiella trinitatis Giglio-Tos 1915 

Acanthopidae
 Acontistinae
 Acontista multicolor (Saussure, 1870)
 Tithrone roseipennis (Saussure, 1877)
 Acanthopinae
 Acanthops parafalcata Lombardo & Ippolito, 2004 

Mantidae
 Angelinae
 Angela quinquemaculata (Olivier, 1792)
 Stagmomantinae
 Stagmomantis carolina (Johannson, 1763)

 Stagmatopterinae
 Stagmatoptera septentrionalis Saussure & Zehntner, 1894
 Parastagmatoptera unipunctata Burmeister, 1838
 Oxyopsis rubicunda Stoll, 1813
 Vatinae
 Vates lobata (Fabricius, 1798)
 Phyllovates tripunctata (Burmeister, 1838)
 Photinae
 Paraphotina reticulata (Saussure 1871)
 Brunneria subaptera Saussure 1869

Liturgusidae
 Liturgusinae
 Liturgusa trinidadensis Svenson 2014

References 

 Mantids
Trinidad And Tobago
Mantids